Politics.co.uk is a news and feature website focussing on British politics. For almost a decade up until the summer of 2021, the site was edited by the political journalist, Ian Dunt. Dunt has since returned as editor-at-large.  Adam Bienkov, the political editor at Business Insider, was previously the deputy editor of politics.co.uk.

History 
Politics.co.uk has been covering British politics for over twenty years since it was first established in 2002, and is owned by the digital publishing company, Senate Media.

In an interview with politics.co.uk during the 2010 General Election, then Prime Minister, Gordon Brown appeared to support tactical voting in that year's UK General Election stating, "I want everyone to vote Labour", before adding, "But if people don't want a Conservative government then they must make sure they don't let the Conservatives in".

In 2013, the then UKIP MEP,  Godfrey Bloom, attracted controversy after writing an opinion article on politics.co.uk in which he claimed women were more suited to finding "mustard in the pantry" than driving cars.   Shortly after his 2,000 word article, Bloom lost the UKIP whip.

Political outlook 
Politics.co.uk itself states that it is politically independent. However, it was previously seen to have adopted a strongly anti-Brexit stance under Dunt's Editorship.  In 2017, Dunt wrote the book, Brexit: What the hell happens now.

References 

British news websites